Mesembryanthemum tortuosum (many synonyms, including Sceletium tortuosum) is a succulent plant in the family Aizoaceae native to the Cape Provinces of South Africa. It is known as kanna, channa, kougoed (kauwgoed/ 'kougoed', prepared from 'fermenting' M. tortuosum)—which literally means, 'chew(able) things' or 'something to chew'.

Eight species related to M. tortuosum have also been placed in the genus Sceletium: M. crassicaule, M. emarcidum, M. exalatum, M. expansum, M. archeri (S. rigidum), M. ladismithiense (S. strictum), M. tortuosum and M. varians.

History 
The plant has been used by South African pastoralists and hunter-gatherers as a mood-altering substance from prehistoric times. The first known written account of the plant's use was in 1662 by Jan van Riebeeck. The traditionally prepared dried plant was often chewed and the saliva swallowed, but it has also been made into gel caps, teas and tinctures. It has also been used as a snuff and smoked.

Uses
M. tortuosum is traditionally used to fight stress and depression, relieve pain and alleviate hunger.

M. tortuosum has been studied to alleviate excessive nocturnal barking in dogs, or meowing in cats, in pets diagnosed with dementia.

Cultivation 
M. tortuosum can be grown from seeds and be propagated from cuttings. Its cultivation and care are similar to cactaceae like Echinopsis. The optimal temperature is at least 16°C and it does not tolerate frost.

Pharmacology
M. tortuosum contains about 1–1.5% total alkaloids. A standardised ethanolic extract of dried M. tortuosum had an IC50 for SERT of 4.3 μg/ml and for PDE4 inhibition of 8.5 μg/ml.

Mesembrine
Mesembrine is a major alkaloid present in M. tortuosum. There is about 0.3% mesembrine in the roots and 0.86% in the leaves, stems, and flowers of the plant.

Safety

General
Traditional and contemporary methods of preparation serve to reduce levels of potentially harmful oxalates found in M. tortuosum. An analysis indicated levels of 3.6-5.1% oxalate, which falls within the median range for crop plants, just like spinach or kale. It is speculated that physical crushing of the plant and the fermentation process reduce the potentially harmful effects of oxalic acid. In particular, free oxalic acid is likely to complex with cell wall-associated calcium salts and precipitate as calcium oxalate when plant material is crushed.

Animal studies
No treatment-related adverse effects were observed in an oral toxicity study in rats of a standardized hydroethanolic extract of M. tortuosum. The extract, although not mesembrine itself, produced ataxia in rats, thereby possibly limiting the usefulness of the extract as an antidepressant.

Human studies
In a study evaluating its safety, a 2:1 standardised extract consumed by healthy adults at a dose of up to 25 mg once daily over a three-month period was well tolerated, with adverse effects such as headache not occurring more than when taking a placebo.

Gallery

See also
 Ethnomedicine
 Psychoactive plants

References

External links
 Monograph on Sceletium tortuosum
 The past, present and possible future of kanna Video. Talk of Nigel Gericke at Ethnopharmacologic Search for Psychoactive Drugs. 2017.

Further reading
 

Aizoaceae
Flora of the Cape Provinces
Antidepressants
Anxiolytics
Plants used in traditional African medicine